Žygimantas Stanulis (born 11 January 1993) is a retired Lithuanian weightlifter who won a silver medal at the 2013 European Weightlifting Championships in Tirana.

He competed in the 2011 World Weightlifting Championships – Men's 105 kg, the 2014 World Weightlifting Championships – Men's 94 kg, and the 2015 World Weightlifting Championships – Men's 94 kg events.

In 2020 Stanulis was disqualified to doping rules violations. Stanulis retired from competitive weightlifting in March 2022.

References

External links
 

1993 births
Living people
Lithuanian male weightlifters
Universiade medalists in weightlifting
Universiade bronze medalists for Lithuania
Lithuanian sportspeople in doping cases
Doping cases in weightlifting
European Weightlifting Championships medalists
Medalists at the 2013 Summer Universiade
21st-century Lithuanian people